
Gmina Spytkowice is a rural gmina (administrative district) in Nowy Targ County, Lesser Poland Voivodeship, in southern Poland.

Neighbouring gminas
Gmina Spytkowice is bordered by the gminas of Bystra-Sidzina, Jabłonka, Jordanów and Raba Wyżna.

References
Polish official population figures 2006

Spytkowice
Gmina Spytkowice